Ryan Frank Cabrera (born July 18, 1982) is an American musician. He began his career as a lead singer for the Dallas band Rubix Groove before pursuing his solo career. Following the 2001 release of independent album Elm St., he released his first major-label album, Take It All Away, on August 17, 2004. Earlier in the year, Cabrera had become known for his up-tempo pop-rock single "On the Way Down". It was then followed by Cabrera's second single, "True"; and his third single "40 Kinds of Sadness".

Early life
Cabrera was born in Dallas, Texas to Francisco "Frank" Cabrera and Debbie Cabrera. His Father is Colombian and his Mother is American. He was raised in Flower Mound, Texas, a suburb of the Dallas-Fort Worth Metroplex. He attended Jesuit College Preparatory School of Dallas, graduating with the Class of 2000. During this time, he was the lead singer of a self-described "noisy punk band" called Caine which he described as being "as bad as our name suggested" in a 2007 interview with Billboard. After graduation he briefly attended The University of Texas at Dallas before dropping out to pursue music.

Career
After leaving school, Cabrera played in the band Rubix Groove, which opened for artists like Cheap Trick and Third Eye Blind. Cabrera composed three songs that impressed a studio engineer, who then let Cabrera record a full-length album, Elm St., for free at Deep Ellum Studios.

Take It All Away
Cabrera was signed to Atlantic Records in 2002. His major debut single "On the Way Down" debuted on American radio in May 2004. "On the Way Down" peaked at number 15 on the Billboard Hot 100 singles chart.

Take It All Away was released on August 17, 2004, at number eight on the Billboard 200 album chart and sold over 66,000 copies in its first week and eventually was certified Platinum. John Rzeznik, lead singer of the Goo Goo Dolls, produced Take It All Away. The second single was "True", whose music video featured Taylor Cole, an actress from the TV show Summerland. The third single was "40 Kinds of Sadness". Cabrera appeared on the Son of the Mask soundtrack with the song "Inside Your Mind" and the Fantastic Four soundtrack with the song "Always Come Back To You". Cabrera has starred in a concert film, Live at the Wiltern, with him performing songs from his album Take It All Away.

2005–2008: You Stand Watching
Cabrera's second album, You Stand Watching, was released on September 20, 2005, and it included his singles "Shine On" and "Photo". Cabrera's relationship with Ashlee Simpson inspired "Photo". Several songs were co-written with singer-songwriter Andrew Ripp. You Stand Watching debuted at No. 24 on the Billboard 200 and sold around 37,000 in its first week.

In 2006, Cabrera released the single "I Will Remember You". The song was used soon thereafter as the closing montage for the series finale of Will & Grace. Soon after, the song was used to send off the female contestants on the 3rd season of So You Think You Can Dance. He added a re-recorded version of the song at the end of his third album, The Moon Under Water.

The Moon Under Water was released on May 13, 2008, under Frolic Room Records/ Papa Joe Records and peaked at No. 177 on the Billboard 200. It released two singles, "Say" and "Enemies".

2012–present

On July 3, 2012, Cabrera released a new song called "Home". On August 2, he released another single called "I See Love" on iTunes, where it reached No. 83 on the top 100. In January 2013, he went on a U.S. tour with Tyler Hilton and Teddy Geiger.

In March 2013, Cabrera launched the web series Live From Ryan's Living Room. Joining Ryan were celebrities including Colbie Caillat, Tyler Hilton, Chord Overstreet and Mark Ballas. Each month Ryan chose a charity to benefit, one being City of Hope National Medical Center. In September 2013, Ryan went on an Ireland and UK tour with Boyce Avenue.

In 2014, Cabrera was the first artist signed to Dynamite Music, which was founded by Mitchell Davis and Marco Liuzzo in partnership with Caroline Records and Universal Music Group. On October 7, 2014, Cabrera announced his single "House on Fire" with a video on his Facebook page. The single was released to iTunes on October 22. He released a lyric video for his single "House on Fire" on November 3, 2014, on Artist Direct's website. "House on Fire" peaked at number one on the US dance chart. Cabrera's EP, Wake Up Beautiful, was released on March 3, 2015.

Formed in late 2015, Beyond the Sky is a musical conglomerate consisting of players, producers and vocalists from a multitude of genres. Cabrera took lead in this collaborative project, whose first single "Right on the Money" was released on February 12, 2016.

Television appearances
In 2004, Cabrera appeared in several episodes of the first season of singer Ashlee Simpson's reality show, The Ashlee Simpson Show. Simpson appeared in Cabrera's music video for "On the Way Down". Cabrera later opened for Simpson's older sister Jessica's tour.

In 2005, Cabrera hosted the MTV series Score, in which contestants write and perform songs to vie for the heart of a guest on the show.

In 2010, he appeared in several episodes of The Hills during its sixth and final season. The episodes chronicled his romance and eventual break-up with Audrina Patridge. In 2010 he also appeared in the E! television show, Pretty Wild. He has appeared as himself in episodes of the USA Network television show, Miz & Mrs. He also made an appearance in 2019 on The Hills: New Beginnings, again alongside Patridge.

Personal life
At the end of 2019, Cabrera began dating professional wrestler Alexis Kaufman, better known as Alexa Bliss. They got engaged on November 14, 2020. The couple were married on April 9, 2022, in Palm Desert, California.

Philanthropy
Cabrera arranged and hosted the livestream Camp Fire Concert Special benefiting Camp Ronald McDonald for Good Times on July 30, 2020. Nicholas Petricca, Joey Fatone, Jaret Reddick, Ryan Key, Secondhand Serenade, Jay Buchanan, Fabian Manzano, Debbie Gibson, Shawn Hook, Chris August, and Tyler Ward performed songs for the concert in addition to Cabrera himself. Cabrera's wife Alexa Bliss, Chris Kirkpatrick, Lance Bass, Michael Strahan, and The Miz also appeared to voice support. The event successfully raised over $30,000.

Discography

Studio albums

EPs

Singles

Music videos

References

1982 births
Living people
American male singer-songwriters
American people of Colombian descent
Jesuit College Preparatory School of Dallas alumni
Musicians from Dallas
Singer-songwriters from Texas
21st-century American male singers
21st-century American singers